Joseph Mayoma Olaleye (born 22 November 1996) is a Nigerian professional footballer who plays as a forward for I-League club TRAU.

Club career
Born in Nigeria, Olaleye made his senior debut with I-league club TRAU, in the 2019–20 season and has secured 11 appearances for the Indian side primarily playing as right midfielder and centre-forward. Joseph also assisted Joel Sunday to score a goal against Mohun Bagan but they faced a decimating defeat of 1-3 due to well anticipated goals of Spaniards  Fran González and Joseba Beitia. Also, Senegalese Baba Diawara contributed a goal to the Kolkata based side. 

Initially signed by the Indian side TRAU, he had appearance for the senior squad and played for I-League 2nd Division side (erstwhile) in the 2018–19 season whereby the Nigerian has played up to the standards and made the club enable to acquire the promotion in the I-League whereby he secured 7 goals in 13 games. The Nigerian possess a decent chemistry with Princewill Emeka, who emerged as the leading goalscorer in the 2018–19 campaign.

Career statistics

Club

References

1996 births
Living people
Nigerian footballers
Association football forwards
I-League players
TRAU FC players
I-League 2nd Division players
Nigerian expatriate footballers
Nigerian expatriate sportspeople in India
Expatriate footballers in India